HyBreed is the fourth release by Industrial metal band Red Harvest. It was released in 1996.

Track listing

External links
 Red Harvest's official website

 

1996 albums
Red Harvest (band) albums